South Lebanon Township may refer to:

 South Lebanon Township, Sharp County, Arkansas, in Sharp County, Arkansas
 South Lebanon Township, Lebanon County, Pennsylvania

See also
 Lebanon Township (disambiguation)
 North Lebanon Township (disambiguation)

Township name disambiguation pages